Christmas Back to You is the eighth studio album by American R&B artist Chanté Moore released on November 3, 2017, through CM7 Records. The album was preceded by the release of the single "Cover Me in Snow." This marks her first full-length Christmas album; following "Christmas Morn", released on the MCA Records compilation, My Christmas Album (1999) and the Boney James release, "Santa Baby" from the album Christmas Present (2007).

Singles
"Cover Me In Snow" premiered as the album's lead single on October 23, 2017 with the release of a music video. EBONY writer Bianca Garwood describes, the video as "sultry", writing, 'The visual finds the music veteran in a one-piece suit under a sleeveless fur. She later takes it up a notch and lays in a bathtub covered with diamonds.' Speaking on the album, Christmas Back to You, Moore expressed, “I am beyond excited to finally be able to release this amazing body of work,” Moore shared. I love Christmas and to be able to give my fans something different and from the heart, feels awesome.”

"Every Day's Like Christmas" was released as the album's second single in 2018. In December, 2018, "Every Day's Like Christmas" debuted at number 43 on the Mediabase Urban Adult Contemporary chart, peaking at number 34 on December 26, 2018. In 2022, "Every Day's Like Christmas" re-entered the Mediabase Urban Adult Contemporary chart at number 42.

Critical reception

The New York Times reviewed Christmas Back to You positively, writing that Moore 'sounds robust on this album, but maybe not in the ways you expect'. Explaining further, 'Ms. Moore sings in the clipped syllables of Atlanta rap. And there is a very familiar sort of love song here as well: “Birthday,” which begins, “Even though it’s your birthday/you’re still working/it out for me.” But it isn’t just any dedicated partner on the receiving end of this sensuous ode: It’s Jesus. J. C.'

Track listing

Release history

References

2017 Christmas albums
Chanté Moore albums
Contemporary R&B Christmas albums